Samsul Huda Bachchu is a Jatiya Party (Ershad) politician and the former Member of Parliament of Narsingdi-1.

Career
Bachchu fought in Bangladesh Liberation war. He was elected to parliament from Narsingdi-1 as a Jatiya Party candidate in 1986. He was the President of Narsingdi District unit of Jatiya Party.

Death
Bachchu died on 10 February 2016 in Narsingdi town, Bangladesh.

References

Jatiya Party politicians
2016 deaths
3rd Jatiya Sangsad members